Utagawa Kunisada (1786 – 12 January 1865), also known as Utagawa Toyokuni III, was a Japanese ukiyo-e artist. He is considered the most popular, prolific and commercially successful designer of ukiyo-e woodblock prints in 19th-century Japan. In his own time, his reputation far exceeded that of his contemporaries, Hokusai, Hiroshige and Kuniyoshi.

Evaluation of Kunisada in art history
At the end of the Edo period (1603–1867), Hiroshige, Kuniyoshi and Kunisada were the three best representatives of the Japanese color woodcut in Edo (capital city of Japan, now Tokyo). However, among European and American collectors of Japanese prints, beginning in the late 19th and early 20th century, all three of these artists were actually regarded as rather inferior to the greats of classical ukiyo-e, and therefore as having contributed considerably to the downfall of their art. For this reason, some referred to their works as "decadent".

Beginning in the 1930s and 1970s, respectively, the works of Hiroshige and Kuniyoshi were submitted to a re-evaluation, and these two are now counted among the masters of their art. Thus, from Kunisada alone was withheld, for a long time, the acknowledgment which is due to him. With a few exceptions, such as actor portraits (yakusha-e) and portraits of beautiful women (bijin-ga), at the beginning of his career, and some series of large-size actor head-portraits near the end, it was thought that he had  produced only inferior works. It was not until the early 1990s, with the appearance of Jan van Doesburg's overview of the artistic development of Kunisada, and Sebastian Izzard's extensive study of his work, that this picture began to change, with Kunisada more clearly revealed as one of the "giants" of the Japanese print that he was.

Biography
Although not much is known of the details of Kunisada's life, there are some well-established records of particular events. He was born in 1786 in Honjo, an eastern district of Edo. His given name was Sumida Shōgorō IX (角田庄五朗), and he was also called Sumida Shōzō (角田庄蔵). A small licensed and hereditary ferry-boat service belonged to his family, and the income derived from this business provided a certain basic financial security to engage in leisure activities such as painting. His father, who was an amateur poet of some renown, died in the year after his birth. While growing up, he developed an early talent for painting and drawing.  His early sketches at that time impressed Toyokuni, the great master of the Utagawa school and prominent designer of  kabuki and actor-portrait prints. In the year 1800 or shortly thereafter Kunisada was accepted by Toyokuni I as an apprentice in his workshop. In keeping with a tradition of Japanese master-apprentice relations, he was then given the official artist name of "KUNI-sada", the first character of which was derived from the second part of the name "Toyo-KUNI".

His first known print dates to the year 1807. However this seems to have been an exceptional design, and further full-sized prints appear starting only in 1809–1810. As of 1808 he had already begun work as an illustrator of e-hon (woodblock print illustrated books) and his popularity rapidly increased. In 1809 he was referred to in contemporary sources as the "star attraction" of the Utagawa school, and soon thereafter was  considered as at least equal to his teacher Toyokuni in the area of book illustration. Kunisada's first actor portraits appeared in either 1808 or 1809. It is known that his first bijin-ga series and a series of pentaptychs of urban scenes of Edo, appear simultaneously in 1809. By 1813 he had risen as a "star" in the constellation of Edo's artistic world; a contemporary list of the most important ukiyo-e artists places him in second place behind Toyokuni I.  Kunisada remained one of the "trendsetters" of the Japanese woodblock print until his death in early 1865.

Beginning around 1810 Kunisada used the studio name "Gototei", which refers cryptically to his father's ferry-boat business. Until 1842 this signature appeared on nearly all of his kabuki designs. Around 1825 the studio name "Kochoro" appeared, and was often used on prints not related to kabuki. This name was derived from a combination of the pseudonyms of master painter Hanabusa Itcho, and that of his successor Hanabusa Ikkei, with whom Kunisada had studied a new style of painting around 1824–1825.  In 1844, he finally adopted the name of his master Toyokuni I, and for a brief time used the signature "Kunisada becoming Toyokuni II". Starting in 1844–1845, all of his prints are signed "Toyokuni", partially with the addition of other studio names as prefixes, such as "Kochoro" and "Ichiyosai". Although Kunisada referred to himself as "Toyokuni II", he must be regarded, however, as "Toyokuni III". The question is unsettled as to why he intentionally ignored Toyoshige, a pupil and son-in-law of Toyokuni I and who had borne the name "Toyokuni", as legitimate head of the Utagawa school, from 1825 until his own death in 1835. Towards the end of his life he began recording his age with his signature on his prints.  

The date of Kunisada's death was the 15th day of the 12th month of the First Year of Genji. Most sources erroneously report this as having been in the year 1864, though this date in the Japanese calendar corresponds to the date January 12, 1865, in the Gregorian calendar. Kunisada died in the same neighborhood in which he had been born.

Artistic activity
Almost from the first day of his activity, and even at the time of his death in 1865, Kunisada was a trendsetter in the art of the Japanese woodblock print. Always at the vanguard of his time, and in tune with the tastes of the public, he continuously developed his style, which was sometimes radically changed, and did not adhere to stylistic constraints set by any of his contemporaries. His productivity was extraordinary. About 14,500 individual designs have been catalogued (polyptych sets counted as a single design) corresponding to more than 22,500 individual sheets. It seems probable based on these figures that Kunisada actually produced between 20,000 and 25,000 designs for woodblock prints during his lifetime (i.e. 35,000 to 40,000 individual sheets).  

Following the traditional pattern of the Utagawa school, Kunisada's main occupation was kabuki and actor prints, and about 60% of his designs fall in this category. However he was also highly active in the area of bijin-ga prints (comprising about 15% of his complete works), and their total number was far higher than any other artist of his time.
From 1820 to 1860 he likewise dominated the market for portraits of sumo wrestlers. For a long time (1835–1850) he had an almost complete monopoly on the genre of prints related to The Tale of Genji; it was only after 1850 that other artists began to produce similar designs. Noteworthy also are the number of his surimono, and although they were designed almost exclusively prior to 1844, few artists were better-known in this area.

Kunisada's paintings, which were privately commissioned, are little-known, but can be compared to those of other masters of ukiyoe painting. His activity as a book illustrator is also largely unexplored. He was no less productive in the area of ehon than he was in full-sized prints, and notable among his book prints are shunga pictures, which appeared in numerous books. Due to censorship, they are signed only on the title page with his alias "Matahei". Landscape prints and musha-e (samurai warrior prints) by Kunisada are rare, and only about 100 designs in each of these genres are known. He effectively left these two fields to be covered by his contemporaries Hiroshige and Kuniyoshi, respectively.

The mid-1840s and early 1850s, were a period of expansion when woodblock prints were in high demand in Japan. During this time Kunisada collaborated with one of or both Hiroshige and Kuniyoshi in three major series as well as on a number of smaller projects. This co-operation was in large part politically motivated in order to demonstrate solidarity against the intensified censorship regulations of the Tenpō Reforms. Also beginning around the mid-1850s there are series in which individual parts of designs (and sometimes complete sheets) are signed by Kunisada's students; this was done with the intention of promoting their work as individual artists. Notable students of Kunisada included Toyohara Kunichika, Utagawa Sadahide and Utagawa Kunisada II.
The majority of Kunisada's work was of actors portrayed in current popular plays; most of the rest was of women in the latest fashions.  The works dated with quickly-changing fashions, and there was a constant demand for new prints to replace the outdated ones.

Reception and legacy

Kunisada had a five-decade prominent career, during which his work was always phenomenally popular and sold in the thousands, letting him become the all-time bestselling designer of Japanese woodblock prints.
A well-known anecdote recorded in Biographies of the Utagawa School Artists by Iijima Kyoshin, written beginning of the 1890s, relates that the young Kuniyoshi, having languished for years as an artist, once observed Kunisada, ten years older and already an enormously popular artist, dressed in rich clothes and heartily enjoying himself with a beautiful geisha along the roads in Edo. Spurred by envy, Kuniyoshi vowed to renew devotion to his art and later achieved the success he craved.
Kunisada was so famous that, in order to help his friend Hiroshige promote the first edition of the Tokaido, he designed an own serie of The fifty-three stations of the Tokaido, adding one of his popular beauties in the foreground of each of Hiroshige's landscapes.

Early 20th-century critics have been reluctant to declare merit in his work, particularly the one of the later period.  An example of the contempt early Western critics subjected Kunisada's work to:

It is only with the 1990s that Kunisada's work re-gained widespread appreciation. Nowadays, Kunisada is again well-regarded as one of the main masters of the ukiyo-e art:

Collections 

Recent Exhibits:

 A Third Gender, Royal Ontario Museum & Japan Society, 2017 
 Showdown!, MFA Boston, 2016
 Utagawa, Brooklyn Museum of Art, 2008 
 Living for the Moment: Japanese Prints from the Collection of Barbara S. Bowman, LACMA, 2006

Featured in Major Collections:

 British Museum
 Evansville Museum of Arts, History and Science
 Minneapolis Institute of Art
 Metropolitan Museum of Art
 Museum of Fine Arts, Boston
 Los Angeles County Museum of Art
 University of California, Berkeley
 Vanderbilt University Fine Arts Gallery

See also
Utagawa school
List of Utagawa school members

References

Works cited

Further reading
 Sebastian Izzard, Kunisada's World (Japan Society, New York, 1993)
 Lars Berglund, Recapturing Utagawa Kunisada: 24 Prints from the Anders Rikardson Collection (p. 59ff, Vol 25, Issue 1, January–February 1995, Arts of Asia, Hong Kong)
 Jan van Doesburg, What about Kunisada? (Huys den Esch, Dodewaard, 1990)
 Shigeru Shindo, (translated Yoko Moizumi, E. M. Carmichael), Kunisada: The Kabuki Actor Portraits (Graphic-Sha, Tokyo, 1993)
 Ellis Tinios, Mirror of the Stage: The Actor Prints of Kunisada (University Gallery, Leeds, 1996)
 Willibald Netto, Kunisada (1786–1865) Ausstellung im Kupferstich-Kabinett des Wallraf-Richartz-Museums [Katalog]" (Wallraf-Richartz-Museums, Köln, 1966)
 Robert Schaap, (introduction by Sebastian Izzard), Kunisada: imaging drama and beauty, 2016

External links

The Utagawa Kunisada Project Overview of Kunisada's work with thousands of pictures, series titles, lists of actors and kabuki dramas portrayed by Kunisada, and detailed study of his artistic names and signatures. During his lifetime, he produced a staggering number of prints, so that even a  partial list  includes nearly 1,000 series.
Kunisada

1786 births
1865 deaths
Ukiyo-e artists
Artists from Tokyo
Japanese portrait painters
Utagawa school